Winston October (born July 12, 1976) is the wide receivers coach at his alma mater, Richmond. He was previously wide receivers coach and passing game coordinator for the Edmonton Elks of the Canadian Football League (CFL). He is a former Canadian football defensive back who played six seasons in the CFL with the Montreal Alouettes and Eskimos. He played college football at the University of Richmond and attended Gar-Field Senior High School in Woodbridge, Virginia. He was also a member of the Washington Redskins of the National Football League.

College career
October was a four-time All-Atlantic 10 defensive back selection while playing for the Richmond Spiders. He also served as team captain during the Spiders' Atlantic 10 championship season in 1998 and was named All-America by The Sports Network. He finished his career ranked first on the conference's all-time punt return yardage list.

Professional career

Montreal Alouettes
October signed with the Montreal Alouettes in 1999. He was used mainly as a kick returner, also seeing time at defensive back. He returned two punts for touchdowns and a missed field 111 yards for a touchdown during the 2000 CFL season. He became a free agent after the 2000 season.

Washington Redskins
October spent the 2001 offseason with the Washington Redskins of the National Football League after signing with the team in April 2001.

Edmonton Eskimos
October was signed by the Edmonton Eskimos in September 2001 and played for the team through the 2004 CFL season. He returned four punts for touchdowns during his time with the Eskimos. He also had 1,018 kickoff return yards in 2003 and 1,073 in 2004. October saw time as a wide receiver, recording 19 receptions for 196 yards in 2003.

Coaching career

Virginia Military Institute
October joined the VMI Keydets coaching staff as an assistant coach during the summer of 2007, spending his first two season coaching the secondary. He became the wide receivers coach in 2009, a position he held for five years.

College of William & Mary
October became the William & Mary Tribe's wide receivers coach in March 2014. Winston remained with William & Mary through the 2017 season.

Ottawa Redblacks 
Winston joined the Ottawa Redblacks of the CFL in time for the 2018 season. The following offseason offensive coordinator Jaime Elizondo left the team which expanded Winston's role for the 2019 season to include the responsibility of play calling.

Edmonton Elks 
On January 15, 2020, it was announced that October had joined the Edmonton Elks as the team's receivers coach and passing game coordinator.

Richmond Spiders 
In January of 2022, October joined the staff at his alma mater, Richmond, as the wide receivers coach.

References

External links
Edmonton Eskimos coaching bio
Just Sports Stats

Living people
1976 births
Guyanese players of American football
Guyanese players of Canadian football
Players of American football from Virginia
American football defensive backs
American football return specialists
Canadian football defensive backs
Canadian football return specialists
Canadian football wide receivers
Richmond Spiders football players
Montreal Alouettes players
Edmonton Elks players
VMI Keydets football coaches
William & Mary Tribe football coaches
People from Woodbridge, Virginia
Afro-Guyanese people